Hillsborough County is located in the west central portion of the U.S. state of Florida. In the 2020 census, the population was 1,459,762, making it the fourth-most populous county in Florida and the most populous county outside the Miami metropolitan area. A 2021 estimate has the population of Hillsborough County at 1,512,070 people with a yearly growth rate of 1.34%, which itself is greater than the populations of 12 states according to their 2019 population estimates. Its county seat and largest city is Tampa. Hillsborough County is part of the Tampa–St. Petersburg–Clearwater Metropolitan Statistical Area.

History

Hillsborough County was created on January 25, 1834, from Alachua and Monroe Counties, during the U.S. territorial period (1822–1845). The new county was named for Wills Hill, the Earl of Hillsborough, who served as British Secretary of State for the Colonies from 1768 to 1772. The County was created through efforts by Augustus Steele.

The county's 1834 area was much larger and included eight other present-day counties: Charlotte County, DeSoto, Hardee, Manatee, Pasco, Pinellas, Polk, and Sarasota.

The last significant change in Hillsborough County's borders was the separation of its western section to create Pinellas County in 1911.

On New Year's Day in 1914, the St. Petersburg-Tampa Airboat Line initiated the first scheduled commercial airline service in the world, from St. Petersburg to Tampa.

Geography
About  of shoreline are on Tampa Bay.

The modern boundaries of the county place it midway along the west coast of Florida.

A narrow portion of Hillsborough County to the south, consisting almost exclusively of water, extends west to the Gulf of Mexico roughly along the Tampa Port Shipping Channel. This has the effect of keeping Hillsborough County from being technically landlocked. The central portion of the Sunshine Skyway Bridge is in Hillsborough County. So is Egmont Key, at the entrance to Tampa Bay; this narrow strip of land separates Pinellas County from Manatee County. The northernmost tip of a spoil island just west of Port Manatee also lies in Hillsborough County.

Hillsborough is home to Alafia River State Park and Hillsborough River state parks, and to the C. W. Bill Young Regional Reservoir and Lithia Springs, one of the largest natural springs in Florida.

Adjacent counties
 Pasco County - north
 Polk County - east
 Manatee County - south
 Pinellas County - west
 Hardee County - southeast

Demographics

2020 Census

As of the 2020 United States census, there were 1,459,762 people, 539,919 households, and 338,683 families residing in the county.

2010 Census
U.S. Census Bureau 2010 Ethnic/Race Demographics:
 White (non-Hispanic) (71.3% when including White Hispanics): 53.7% (12.1% German, 11.0% Irish, 8.9% English, 6.7% Italian, 2.6% French, 2.4% Polish, 1.9% Scottish, 1.6% Scotch-Irish, 1.3% Dutch, 0.8% Russian, 0.8% Swedish, 0.7% Welsh, 0.6% French Canadian, 0.6% Norwegian, 0.5% Hungarian, 0.5% Greek)
 Black (non-Hispanic) (16.7% when including Black Hispanics): 15.6% (2.4% West Indian/Afro-Caribbean American [0.7% Jamaican, 0.6% Haitian, 0.5% Other or Unspecified West Indian, 0.1% Trinidadian and Tobagonian, 0.1% British West Indian, 0.1% U.S. Virgin Islander] 0.9% Subsaharan African)
 Hispanic or Latino of any race: 24.9% (7.4% Puerto Rican, 5.3% Cuban, 5.3% Mexican, 1.2% Colombian, 1.1% Dominican, 0.7% Spaniard, 0.5% Honduran)
 Asian: 3.4% (1.2% Indian, 0.5% Vietnamese, 0.5% Filipino, 0.4% Chinese, 0.4% Other Asian, 0.3% Korean, 0.1% Japanese)
 Two or more races: 3.1%
 American Indian and Alaska Native: 0.4%
 Native Hawaiian and Other Pacific Islander: 0.1%
 Other Races: 5.0% (0.6% Arab)

In 2010, 6.0% of the Hillsborough's population considered themselves to be of only "American" ancestry (regardless of race or ethnicity.)

Of the 536,092 households, 29.74% had children under the age of 18 living with them, 44.25% were married couples living together, 14.76% had a female householder with no husband present, and 35.69% were not families. About 27.12% of all households were made up of individuals, and 7.96% (2.35% male and 5.61% female) had someone living alone who was 65 years of age or older. The average household size was 2.55 and the average family size was 3.11.

The age distribution was 23.9% under the age of 18, 10.5% from 18 to 24, 28.3% from 25 to 44, 25.4% from 45 to 64, and 11.8% were 65 years of age or older. The median age was 36.1 years. For every 100 females, there were 95.1 males. For every 100 females age 18 and over, there were 92.1 males.

The median income for a household in the county was $49,536, and for a family was $59,886. Males had a median income of $43,125 versus $35,184 for females. The per capita income for the county was $27,062. About 10.7% of families and 14.2% of the population were below the poverty line, including 19.9% of those under age 18 and 9.6% of those aged 65 or over.

In 2010, 15.1% of the county's population was foreign born, with 44.5% being naturalized American citizens. Of foreign-born residents, 67.5% were born in Latin America, 16.7% born in Asia, 9.2% were born in Europe, 3.2% born in Africa, 3.1% in North America, and 0.3% were born in Oceania.

2000 Census
As of the census of 2000, 998,948 people, 391,357 households, and 255,164 families resided in the county. The 425,962 housing units averaged 405 per square mile (156/km2). The racial makeup of the county was 75.17% White (63.3% Non-Hispanic White), 14.96% Black or African American, 0.39% Native American, 2.20% Asian, 0.07% Pacific Islander, 4.66% from other races, and a 2.56% from two or more races. 17.99% of the population were Hispanic or Latino of any race. The county was the thirty-second most populous county in the nation.

Of the 391,357 households, 31.40% had children under the age of 18 living with them, 47.70% were married couples living together, 13.20% had a female householder with no husband present, and 34.80% were not families. Roughly 26.90% of all households were made up of individuals, and 8.10% had someone living alone who was 65 years of age or older. The average household size was 2.51 and the average family size was 3.07.

The age distribution was: 25.30%  under the age of 18, 9.30% from 18 to 24, 31.70% from 25 to 44, 21.70% from 45 to 64, and 12.00% were 65 years of age or older.  The median age was 35 years. For every 100 females there were 95.80 males. For every 100 females age 18 and over, there were 92.70 males.

The median income for a household in the county was $40,663, and for a family was $48,223. Males had a median income of $34,111 versus $26,962 for females. The per capita income for the county was $21,812. About 9.10% of families and 12.50% of the population were below the poverty line, including 17.20% of those under age 18 and 10.00% of those age 65 or over.

Source: U.S. Census

Languages
As of 2010, 74.59% of the population spoke only English at home, 19.52% spoke Spanish, 0.56% French Creole (mainly Haitian Creole), and 0.51% spoke Vietnamese as their mother language. In total, 25.41% of the population spoke a language other than English as their primary language.

Politics and government

Voter registration 
According to the Secretary of State's office, Democrats are a plurality of registered voters in Hillsborough County.

Statewide and National Elections 
Hillsborough County tends to lean Democratic, having not been won by a Republican presidential candidate since the 2004 election. For the last quarter-century, it has been a powerful swing county in one of the nation's most important swing states. It is part of the politically important I-4 Corridor between Tampa Bay and Orlando, an area that historically decides most elections in Florida.  Hillsborough was considered a bellwether county, voting for the statewide winner in every presidential election from 1964-2012. It has also voted for the winner of the presidency in every election since 1928 except twice, voting for the loser only in 1992 and 2016. The southern portion of the county, around Tampa, is powerfully Democratic, while the northern and eastern portions are heavily Republican.

On the statewide level, the county also tends to lean Democratic with Democrats Bill Nelson for senator and Andrew Gillum for governor both winning the county in the 2018 elections. However, Republican senator Marco Rubio did win the county in his 2010, 2016 and 2022 senatorial campaigns and Republican Governor Ron Desantis won it in his 2022 gubernatorial campaign after the county supported Democrats for the previous three gubernatorial elections since 2010. 

In 2008, Barack Obama won the county by seven points, the first Democrat to capture the county since Bill Clinton's re-election victory in 1996. Obama won Hillsborough again in 2012 over Republican presidential nominee Mitt Romney by roughly the same margin.

In 2016, Donald Trump became the first Republican since Calvin Coolidge in 1924 to win the election without carrying the county.

Local Politics 
A home rule charter for Hillsborough County was approved by voters in a county-wide referendum held in September 1983, and the first county commissioners elected under this new charter took office on May 28, 1985.

The charter divides the power of county government between legislative and executive branches. The Board of County Commissioners, which composes the legislative branch, sets overall policy by means of ordinances, resolutions, and motions.

The executive powers of county government are vested in the county administrator, appointed by county commissioners and charged by the charter to faithfully implement the powers of the board. The charter provides for a county attorney, to be hired by the county administrator with the advice and consent of the county commissioners. The charter contains a provision for a charter review board appointed by County Commissioners every five years to conduct a study of county government and propose amendments to the charter. These amendments must be presented to voters for approval. One amendment was approved in November 2002, adding the position of County Internal Performance Auditor to the government structure. This position reports directly to the County Commission.

The current administrator is Bonnie M. Wise, who took office on July 1, 2020, replacing Mike Merrill, who had served as administrator since 2010. Wise previously served as the county's deputy administrator and Tampa's chief financial officer.

Of the seven members of the Board of County Commissioners for Hillsborough County, four are elected from single-member districts, and three are elected county-wide. The board approves the county's operating and capital budgets and the county's capital-improvement program. It may take action on any programs for the improvement of the county and the welfare of its residents.

Government officials 
These five countywide elected positions have specific responsibilities under the county charter:
 Clerk of the Circuit Court: Cindy Stuart (D)
 Sheriff: Chad Chronister (R)
 Property Appraiser: Bob Henriquez (D)
 Tax Collector: Nancy Millan (D)
 Supervisor of Elections: Craig Latimer (D)

Under a charter ordinance that went into effect May 1985, county commissioners are directed to perform legislative functions of government by developing policy for the management of Hillsborough County. The county administrator, a professional appointed by the board, and the administrative staff are responsible for the implementation of these policies.

The board also serves as the Environmental Protection Commission. Individual board members serve on various other boards, authorities, and commissions such as the Hillsborough Area Regional Transit Authority, Tampa Bay Regional Planning Council, Tampa Bay Water, Aviation Authority, Expressway Authority, Sports Authority, Port Authority, Arts Council of Hillsborough County, Children's Board, Metropolitan Planning Organization, and Council of Governments.

Taxes
Hillsborough County's discretionary sales tax rate increased from 1% to 2.5% in January 2019. When combined with the state of Florida's 6%, the rate is 8.5%, the highest in Florida. The rate includes two surcharges approved by voter referendum in November 2018, 1% for transportation and 1/2% for schools. It is only collected on the first $5000 of any large purchase.

Economy

In the early 20th century, Hillsborough's economy was predominantly based on cigar-making and agriculture.  In 2012, Hillsborough had the second-largest agricultural output among Florida's counties.  As of 2010, the average annual employment in Hillsborough County was 563,292. The percentages of total employment by industry were:
 Natural resources and mining 2.0%
 Construction 4.6%
 Manufacturing 4.1%
 Trade, transportation, and utilities 19.5%
 Information 3.0%
 Financial activities 9.2%
 Professional and business services 18.1%
 Education and health services 14.6%
 Leisure and hospitality 10.3%
 Other services 2.7%
 Public administration 4.7%

Agriculture
In 2011, sales of all agricultural commodities produced in Hillsborough County were over $832,410,300.  The largest crop by value was strawberries at over $388 million. Values of various crops included:

List of companies with headquarters in Hillsborough County

 Beef O'Brady's Restaurants
 Big Brothers Big Sisters of America
 Bloomin' Brands Restaurants, including Outback Steakhouse, Carrabbas, and others.
 Checkers and Rally's Restaurants
 Front Burner Brands Restaurants, including The Melting Pot, Burger 21, and Grillsmith.
 International Softball Federation
 Lykes Brothers
 MisterCertified
 Mosaic's Phosphate Division
 Odyssey Marine Exploration
 Patterson Companies
 Rooms To Go Furniture
 Shriners International
 Sweetbay Supermarkets (since absorbed by BI-LO's Winn-Dixie chain) had its headquarters in an unincorporated area in the county, near Tampa.
 Sykes Enterprises

Education
Hillsborough County Public Schools operate the public schools in the county. Hillsborough County has the eighth-largest school district in the United States consisting of 206 schools (133 elementary schools, 42 middle schools, two K-8 schools, 27 traditional high schools, and four career centers, with 73 additional schools including charter, ESE, etc.). In 2013, 12 of Hillsborough County's 27 public high schools were ranked in Newsweek's list of America's Best High Schools. In 2012 and 2013, all 27 public high schools were included on the Washington Post's list of the 2000 most challenging schools in America.

Museums and libraries

Museums
 Tampa Museum of Art in Tampa
 Florida Museum of Photographic Arts in Tampa
 Glazer Children’s Museum in Tampa
 Museum of Science & Industry (Tampa)
 Henry B. Plant Museum in Tampa
 Tampa Bay History Center in Tampa

Libraries
These libraries are part of the Hillsborough County Public Library Cooperative:
 Tampa-Hillsborough County Public Library System
 Bruton Memorial Library, located in Plant City and built in 1960. It is a part of the county cooperative but is under the jurisdiction of the City of Plant City.
 Temple Terrace Public Library
Tampa Bay Library Consortium
78th Street Community Library
Arthenia L. Joyner University Area Community Library
Austin Davis Public Library
Bloomingdale Regional Public Library
Brandon Regional Library
C. Blythe Andrews Jr. Public Library
Charles J. Fendig Public Library
Egypt Lake Partnership Library
Florida History & Geology Public Library
James L. Lunsford Law Library
Jan Kaminis Platt Regional Library
Jimmie B. Keel Regional Library
John F. Germany Public Library
Lutz Branch Library
Maureen B. Gauzza Public Library
New Tampa Regional Library
Norma and Joseph Robinson Public Library @ Sulphur Springs
North Tampa Branch Library
Planning Commission Library
Port Tampa City Library
Riverview Public Library
Robert W. Saunders Sr. Public Library
Ruskin Branch Library
Seffner-Mango Branch Library
Seminole Heights Branch Library
SouthShore Regional Library
Thonotosassa Branch Library
Town 'N Country Regional Public Library
West Tampa Branch Library
Witt Research Center

Local agencies
Several agencies provide law enforcement to the residents of Hillsborough County. They are all accredited and fully certified law enforcement agencies by the FDLE.

Hillsborough County Fire Rescue
Hillsborough County Fire Rescue serves the unincorporated areas of Hillsborough County. Fire service began in the 1950s as an all-volunteer force consisting of about a dozen loosely associated community-based organizations. The first full-time career firefighters were hired in 1973.  The department now has 1,019 career uniformed and support personnel who continue to set the pace in fire and emergency medical response, making it the fourth-largest department in the state. Since the 1997 consolidation of Hillsborough County Fire Rescue and Emergency Medical Services (EMS), the department has placed paramedics on each career, front-line apparatus. The department operates 35 ALS transport ambulances, 46 Engine Companies, 5 Truck Companies, 2 Heavy Rescue's, 1 Hazardous Incident Unit, 1 Fire Boat and 1 Rescue Boat. These units operate out of 44 Fire Rescue stations located strategically throughout Hillsborough County. As of summer 2021, 2 additional stations are being constructed to bring that number up to 46. As nearly 85% of the department's more than 113,000  emergency responses require some level of medical care, having paramedics assigned to each unit assures that the citizens of Hillsborough County are receiving rapid advanced life-support care.

Hillsborough County Fire Rescue and the Board of County Commissioners have implemented a plan to continue placing new fire rescue stations in areas where growth is occurring or gaps in coverage may exist.  Fire Chief Dennis Jones leads a senior staff of two deputy chiefs (operations and administrative branches), the fire marshal, and the emergency manager.  All fiscal functions, facilities maintenance and supply, apparatus/equipment procurement, emergency dispatch manager, personnel chief, and training chief are under the direction of the deputy chief of administration.  The three Shift Commanders, as well as the Rescue Chief and the Special Operations Chief, report directly to the Deputy Chief of Operations. The Operations Chief is responsible for the overall response readiness of all front line personnel. The Emergency Manager oversees all Office of Emergency Management (OEM) planning and operations of the EOC.

Hillsborough County Fire Rescue Office of Emergency Management
The Office of Emergency Management is a division of Hillsborough County Fire Rescue that is directly responsible for planning and coordinating the evacuation and sheltering of all county residents in the event of a natural or manmade disaster. This agency is also responsible for planning, orchestrating and coordinating response actions and continuity of government in the aftermath of a major disaster. Preston Cook has been the Emergency Manager since 2011.

The Hurricane Evacuation Assessment Tool  has been created to assist residents of Hillsborough County by providing evacuation and sheltering information in the event of a hurricane or other natural disaster. This interactive program was designed to assist the public in easily determining if they are in one of the five evacuation zones. It also provides information on shelters, hospitals, fire stations, and sandbag locations.

The Office of Emergency Management also provides information to the public on: Hurricane information, procedures for hazardous-materials spills, and flooding, tornado, wildfire, and terrorism preparedness.

Transportation

Airports
The county's primary commercial aviation airport is Tampa International Airport in Tampa.  Other important airports include the Tampa Executive Airport near Brandon, Peter O. Knight Airport near downtown Tampa, and the Plant City Airport near Plant City.

Major freeways and roadways

Interstate Highways
  Interstate 4
  Interstate 75
  Interstate 275

U.S Routes
  U.S. Route 41
  U.S. Route 92
  U.S. Route 301

State Routes
  State Route 618
  State Road 60
  State Road 589
  State Road 580

Public surface transportation
Hillsborough County is served by Hillsborough Area Regional Transit buses.

Nationally protected areas
 Egmont Key National Wildlife Refuge

Parks

 Alafia River Corridor Preserve
 Alderman's Ford Regional Park
 Balm-Boyette Scrub Nature Preserve
 Bell Creek Nature Preserve
 Blackwater Creek Preserve
 Brandon Park & Recreation Center
 Brooker Creek Headwaters Nature Preserve
 Buckhorn Park
 Cacciatore Park
 Calusa Trace Park
 Carolyn Meeker Dog Park
 Carrollwood Meadows Park
 Causeway Park
 Chito Branch Reserve
 Cockroach Bay Aquatic Preserve
 Covington Oak Park
 Cross Creek Park
 Cypress Creek Nature Preserve
 Davis Park
 Dead River Conservation Park
 Deerfield Park
 Diamondback Nature Preserve
 E.G. Simmons Conservation Park
 E.L. Bing Park
 Earl Simmons/Turkey Creek Park & Recreation Center
 Edward Medard Park and Reservoir
 Egypt Lake Recreation Center
 Ekker Nature Preserve
 Fawnridge Park
 Fish Hawk Creek Preserve
 Gardenville Park & Recreation Center
 Glencliff Park
 Golden Aster Scrub Nature Preserve
 Hillsborough River State Park
 Lake Rogers Park
 Lettuce Lake Park
 Lithia Springs Regional Park
 Little Manatee River State Park
 Lower Green Swamp Preserve
 McKay Bay Nature Park
 Schultz Preserve
 Skyway Fishing Pier State Park
 Upper Tampa Bay Park
 Upper Tampa Bay Trail
 Wolf Branch Nature Preserve

Communities

Despite its large population, there are only three incorporated places in Hillsborough County, all cities. Most of the area of the county is unincorporated and falls under the jurisdiction of the Hillsborough County board of commissioners. As of 2020, more than two thirds of the county's population lived in unincorporated areas.

Cities
Populations are as of the 2020 census.
 Tampa - 384,959
 Plant City - 39,764
 Temple Terrace - 26,690

Census-designated places

 Apollo Beach
 Balm
 Bloomingdale
 Brandon
 Carrollwood
 Cheval
 Citrus Park
 Dover
 East Lake-Orient Park
 Egypt Lake-Leto
 Fish Hawk
 Gibsonton
 Keystone
 Lake Magdalene
 Lutz
 Mango
 Northdale
 Odessa
 Palm River-Clair Mel
 Pebble Creek
 Progress Village
 Riverview
 Ruskin
 Seffner
 Sun City Center
 Thonotosassa
 Town 'n' Country
 University
 Valrico
 Westchase
 Wimauma

Unincorporated communities

 Adamsville
 Alafia
 Antioch
 Bay Crest Park
 Boyette (former CDP, now part of Riverview)
 Clair-Mel City
 Del Rio
 Durant
 East Lake
 East Tampa
 Egypt Lake
 Fort Lonesome
 Gulf City
 Hopewell
 Keysville
 Knights
 Lake Fern
 Leto
 Limona
 Lithia
 Nowatney
 Orient Park
 Palma Ceia
 Palm River
 Picnic
 Pinecrest
 Port Sutton
 Rattlesnake
 Remlap
 Rocky Creek
 Snows Corner
 Sulphur Springs
 Sun City
 Sweetwater Creek
 Sydney
 Trapnell
 Turkey Creek

Historic towns

 Bullfrog Corner
 Bone Valley
 Branchton
 Callsville
 Chataocolea
 Chicora
 Clarkwild
 Coronet
 Cork (now Dover, not to be confused with two other places named Cork)
 Cork (now Plant City)
 Cosme
 Dillon
 Diston
 Drew Park, absorbed by Tampa
 East Cove
 Edeson
 Flora
 Fort Brooke
 Fort Foster
 Fort Sullivan
 Garden City
 Gary
 Gulf City
 Harney
 Hillsboro
 Ichipucksassa, aka Ichepucksassa, Hitchipucksassa (now Plant City)
 Idlewild Park
 Jackson Springs
 Keystone Park
 Knights Station
 Knowles
 Lake Fern
 Lighthall
 Lillibridge
 Magdalene
 Magnolia
 Mangrove Point
 Manhattan (absorbed by Tampa)
 Marvinia
 Midway
 Mullins City
 Nicholls
 Oliphant
 Orient
 Peck
 Pelot
 Peru
 Prairie
 Riverhead
 Rocky Point
 Sparkman
 Stemper
 St Helena
 Trapnell (absorbed by Plant City)
 Welcome
 Weldon
 Willow
 Youmans

See also
 Hillsborough County Sheriff's Office
 Hillsborough County Public Schools
 National Register of Historic Places listings in Hillsborough County, Florida
 USS Hillsborough County (LST-827)
 Upper Tampa Bay Park
 List of schools in Hillsborough County, Florida
 List of counties in Florida
 List of tallest buildings in Tampa

Notes

References

External links

 

 
Charter counties in Florida
Counties in the Tampa Bay area
1834 establishments in Florida Territory
Populated places established in 1834